Orbigny  may refer to:

 One of the abbreviations used for Alcide d'Orbigny in biological citations
 Orbigny, Indre-et-Loire, a commune in the Indre-et-Loire department in France
 Orbigny-au-Mont, a commune in the Haute-Marne department in France
 Orbigny-au-Val, a commune in the Haute-Marne department in France

See also
d'Orbigny (disambiguation)
Arbigny, a French commune